Rajdhani (Urdu: دمارہمغب) is a union council in the Kotli District, Azad Kashmir,  west of the city of Kotli, the capital of the Kotli District and  north of Azad Kashmir's rapidly expanding model city of Mirpur.  The Kotli-Mirpur Main Road  passes through the village.

A large portion of the residents of Rajdhani who have emigrated to Europe reside in Huddersfield, Rochdale, and Oldham and surrounding areas in the United Kingdom.

Rajdhani is located in the south of the Kotli District at an elevation of 620 metres (2,040ft).  The village has a population of approximately 2500, and the dominant group in the village is  Jatt. The ancestral founders of Rajdhani belong to the caste Jatt. Like most of the southern districts of Azad Kashmir, the majority of the population are ethnic Pothoharis.

The first man to travel from Rajdhani to the UK was Haji Farman Ali in the 1940s and was also a member of the British Army and UK Merchant Navy. Haji Farman Ali toured all over the world often bringing back souvenirs to share with friends and family. The first woman to emigrate from Rajdhani to the UK is Zubaida Begum who originally settled in Bradford with her late husband, Bagh Ali, in the early 1960s and currently resides in Huddersfield.

Neighbourhoods and localities

References 
Mangral
Rajdhani Community Forum
Map and info on Kotli District

Union councils of Kotli District